The Polish Round Table Talks took place in Warsaw, Poland from 6 February to 5 April 1989. The government initiated talks with the banned trade union Solidarność and other opposition groups in an attempt to defuse growing social unrest.

History

Following the factory strikes of the early 1980s and the subsequent formation of the (then still underground) Solidarity movement under the leadership of Lech Wałęsa, the political situation in Poland started relaxing somewhat. Despite an attempt by the government to crack down on trade unionism, the movement had gained too much momentum and it became impossible to hold off change anymore. In addition there was fear of a social explosion due to economic malaise and runaway inflation that had depressed Polish living standards and deepened public anger and frustration. By 1988 the authorities began serious talks with the opposition.

In September 1988, when a wave of strikes was coming to an end, a secret meeting was held which included Lech Wałęsa and Minister of Internal Affairs Czesław Kiszczak. They agreed on holding the so-called "Round Table" talks in the near future to plan out the course of action to be undertaken in the country. The Round Table talks began on 6 February 1989 at 14:23 CET. They included the solidarity opposition faction and the coalition government faction. The talks were held in the Council of Ministers Office. The meetings were co-chaired by Wałęsa and Kiszczak.

The Polish communists, led by General Jaruzelski, hoped to co-opt prominent opposition leaders into the ruling group without making major changes in the political power structure. In reality, the talks radically altered the shape of the Polish government and society. The events in Poland precipitated and gave momentum to the fall of the entire European communist bloc; the Yalta arrangement collapsed soon after the events in Poland.

Sessions
The sessions were divided into three main work groups:
Political reform workgroup
Union pluralism workgroup
Economy and social politics workgroup

Specific issues were handled by these work groups, although meetings often ground to a halt. This was caused by a mutual distrust of the factions and an obvious unwillingness of the government faction to relinquish power. The most controversial questions were:
Pay raises and indexation
Future pluralist elections
The limit of the future president's competence
The limit of competence for the future Sejm and Senate
The access to mass communication media by opposition forces

A number of (radical) opposition organisations were quite opposed to the talks as they did not believe in the good intentions of the sitting government. Despite their fears a number of important documents were signed on 5 April, at the conclusion of the sessions. These documents became known as the Round Table Agreement.

Results
An agreement ("Round Table Agreement") was signed on 4 April 1989. The most important demands, including those reflected in the April Novelization, were:
Legalization of independent trade unions
The introduction of the office of President (thereby annulling the power of the Communist party general secretary), who would be elected to a 6-year term
The formation of a Senate

As a result, real political power was vested in a newly created bicameral legislature and in a president who would be the chief executive. Solidarność became a legitimate and legal political party. Free election to 35% of the seats in Sejm and an entirely free election to the Senate was assured.

The election of 4 June 1989 brought a landslide victory to Solidarność: 99% of all the seats in the Senate and all of the 35% possible seats in Sejm. Jaruzelski, whose name was the only one the Polish United Workers' Party allowed on the ballot for the presidency, won by just one vote in the National Assembly. The 65–35 division was soon abolished as well, after the first truly free Sejm elections.

The Round Table sessions were of momentous importance to the future political developments in Poland. They paved the way to a free and democratic Poland as well as the final abolition of communism in Poland.

Criticism
Andrzej Gwiazda, who was one of the leaders of the so-called First Solidarity (August 1980 – December 1981), claims that the Round Table Agreement and the negotiations that took place before it at a Communist government's Ministry of the Interior and Administration (Poland) conference center (late 1988 and early 1989) in the village of Magdalenka had been arranged by Moscow. According to Gwiazda, who himself did not take part in the negotiations, the Soviets "carefully selected a group of opposition activists, who passed on as representatives of the whole [Polish] society, and made a deal with them".

This notion was supported by Anna Walentynowicz, who in an interview given in 2005 stated that the Agreement was a "success of the Communists, not of the nation". According to Walentynowicz, Czesław Kiszczak and Wojciech Jaruzelski, who initiated the negotiations, "safeguarded their own safety and (...) influence on the government". Walentynowicz claims that the talks were organized so that in the future, "no Communist criminal, murderer or thief would pay for their crimes".

Antoni Macierewicz regards the negotiations and the agreement as a "classic Soviet plot of the secret services". In his opinion, both Kiszczak and Jaruzelski were "at every stage controlled by their Soviet overseers (...) and their autonomy was minimal". As Macierewicz said in February 2009, the Round Table was a "tactical success of the parts of the elites, but from the point of view of national interests of Poland, it was a failure".

Piotr Bączek of Gazeta Polska weekly wrote that in the mid-1980s, the so-called Communist Team of three (Jerzy Urban, General Władysław Pożoga and Stanisław Ciosek), suggested that among opposition activists, "search for people, who are politically available" should be initiated, as "yesterday's opponent, drawn into the power, becomes a zealous ally". In June 1987 Mieczysław Rakowski, in a report handed to General Jaruzelski, wrote that a "change in the attitude towards the opposition must be initiated (...) Maybe, out of numerous oppositional fractions, one movement would be selected and allowed to participate in the governing", wrote Rakowski. Bączek's opinion is backed by Filip Musiał, a historian of Kraków's office of Institute of National Remembrance. In June 2008 Musiał stated that the Team of three was ordered to find a solution to a problem, which troubled Communist government of Poland. Economic situation of the country was worsening in the late 1980s, and the threat of social unrest was real. At the same time, the Communists did not want to relinquish power, so they prepared, in Musiał's words, "a political marketing operation".

Musiał says that General Czesław Kiszczak himself decided which oppositional activists were "politically available" – the condition was that the candidates had to be supportive of "evolution" of the system, not its "radical rejection". Therefore, most opposition activists, who took part in the negotiations, were those who at different points of their lives were close to the "Marxist doctrine" or belonged to the Communist party. Furthermore, all participants were carefully scrutinized by the secret services. As a result, Poland was "the first Eastern Europe country, in which talks were initiated, but the last, in which completely free elections were organized, in the fall of 1991". Janusz Korwin-Mikke claims that one of the results of the Round Table agreement was that both sides pledged that "right-wing parties would never be allowed to rule", and Jan Olszewski said that "basic issues had been settled before [the talks], and the negotiations at the Round Table were about secondary matters".

See also
 Contract Sejm
 2019 Sudanese transition to democracy

References

External links

Negotiations at Magdalenka. Adam Michnik and Lech Wałęsa drinking vodka with Czesław Kiszczak
The 1989 Polish Round Table Revisited: Making History Brian Porter 1999

1989 conferences
1989 documents
1989 in Poland
April 1989 events in Europe
Democratization
February 1989 events in Europe
Nonviolent revolutions
Political history of Poland
Revolutions of 1989
Solidarity (Polish trade union)